The Georgian ambassador in Washington, D. C. is the official representative of the Georgian Government in the United States.

List of representatives

References 

 
United States
Georgia